In the context of American public healthcare policy, the Medicaid coverage gap refers to uninsured people who reside in states which have opted out of Medicaid expansion under the Affordable Care Act (ACA), who are both ineligible for Medicaid under its previous rules that still apply in these states and too poor to qualify for the ACA's subsidies and credits designed to allow middle-class Americans to purchase health insurance. The number of Americans in this gap has been estimated to be almost 3 million as of January 2016, according to the Kaiser Family Foundation. The Foundation has also said that 90% of the people in this gap live in the South.

In states that have not expanded Medicaid, eligibility requirements for Medicaid are limited to parents making 44% or less of the poverty line, and in almost all such states, all adults without children are ineligible. The coverage gap results from this and a number of factors, such as the fact that the ACA was designed so that the poor would receive coverage through Medicaid and so did not include an alternative program for them. For example, as of April 2014, someone living in Texas, a non-expansion state, had to be making less than $3,737 per year to be eligible for Medicaid, and had to make at least $11,490 (if a single person) or $23,550 (for a family of four) to be eligible for ACA subsidies.

States such as Idaho, Utah, Maine, Oklahoma, Missouri, and South Dakota addressed the Medicaid gap through ballot measures, a form of direct democracy.

See also 

 Medicaid
 Medicaid estate recovery
 Patient Protection and Affordable Care Act

References

Affordable Care Act
Medicare and Medicaid (United States)